Alan Wilson (24 April 1920 – 6 April 2015) played first-class cricket for Lancashire as a tail-end batsman and wicketkeeper between 1948 and 1962. He was born at Newton-le-Willows, Lancashire, England.

Wilson played 171 first-class matches for Lancashire over 15 seasons, but was intermittently throughout his career superseded by other wicketkeepers who were generally better batsmen: Alfred Barlow in 1950, Frank Parr in 1953 and John Jordan in 1956. He was finally supplanted by Geoff Clayton in 1959 but returned for a single game in 1962 when he was granted a benefit to reward his loyalty.

References

External links

1920 births
2015 deaths
English cricketers
Lancashire cricketers
People from Newton-le-Willows
Wicket-keepers